The  Sacramento Mountain Lions season was the third season for the United Football League franchise. The team finished with a 1–3 record and fourth in the league.

Offseason

UFL draft

Personnel

Staff

Roster

Schedule

Standings

Game summaries

Week 1: vs. Las Vegas Locomotives

Week 3: vs. Omaha Nighthawks

Week 4: at Virginia Destroyers

Week 5: Virginia Destroyers

Week 6: at Omaha Nighthawks

References

Sacramento Mountain Lions season
Sacramento Mountain Lions seasons
Sacramento Mountain Lions